Events in the year 2015 in Gabon.

Incumbents 

 President: Ali Bongo Ondimba
 Prime Minister: Daniel Ona Ondo

Events 

 6 & 27 October – Legislative elections were held in the country, alongside municipal elections.

Deaths

References 

 
2010s in Gabon
Years of the 21st century in Gabon
Gabon